USS LST-1061 was an  in the United States Navy. Like many of her class, she was not named and is properly referred to by her hull designation.

Construction
She was laid down on 26 December 1944, at Hingham, Massachusetts, by the Bethlehem-Hingham Shipyard; launched on 3 February 1945; sponsored by Mrs. Ada Smith; and commissioned on 1 March 1945.

Service history
Following World War II, LST-1061 performed occupation duty in the Far East until mid-September 1945. She returned to the United States and was decommissioned on 1 May 1946, and struck from the Navy list on 3 July, that same year. On 1 March 1948, the ship was sold to the Texas Petroleum Co. for operation.

Notes

Citations

Bibliography 

Online resources

External links
 

 

LST-542-class tank landing ships
Ships built in Hingham, Massachusetts
1945 ships
World War II amphibious warfare vessels of the United States